Coelogyne is a genus of over 200 sympodial epiphytes from the family Orchidaceae, distributed across India, China, Indonesia and the Fiji islands, with the main centers in Borneo, Sumatra and the Himalayas. They can be found from tropical lowland forests to montane rainforests. A few species grow as terrestrials or even as lithophytes in open, humid habitats. The genera Bolborchis Lindl., Hologyne Pfitzer and Ptychogyne Pfitzer are generally included here. The genus is abbreviated Coel. in trade journals.

Name 
The name Coelogyne was first published as Caelogyne in 1821 by John Lindley. and is derived from the Ancient Greek words κοῖλος (koîlos, hollow) and γῠνή (gunḗ, woman), referring to the concave stigma.

A few species are commonly known as "necklace orchids", because of their long, pendant, multi-flowered inflorescence.

Description 
This genus lacks the saccate base of the labellum, a typical characteristic which is present in the other genera in the subtribe Coelogyninae. The free lip has high lateral lobes along the basal part of the labellum (hypochile) and smooth, toothed or warty keels.

The pseudobulbs  of one internode vary in size. They may be closely or widely spaced through sympodial growth along the rhizome.

Inflorescences often show a small to very large number of showy, medium-sized to large flowers. They may arise either from the apex of the newly completed pseudobulb at the end of the growing season (as in Coelogyne fimbriata), or may precede the new growth in early spring (as in Coelogyne cristata). The typical colour range of this genus is white, through tawny brown to green, and occasionally peachy tones. All species have four pollinia.

They have often a sweet scent, attracting different kinds of pollinators, such as bees, wasps  and beetles.

Distribution 
The cooler growing species such as Coelogyne fimbriata, Coelogyne ovalis, Colegyne fuliginosa, Coelogyne cristata, Coelogyne flaccida, Coelogyne nitida originate in the Himalayan region of India and southeast Asia.

Taxonomy 
The traditional taxonomy of the genus Coelogyne is still disputed. Coelogyne has been subdivided in 23 sections or subgenera by De Vogel (1994) and Clayton. Molecular data show that Coelogyne is paraphyletic and should be reorganised. It should include the genera Neogyna and Pholidota, and several sections should be removed, including Cyathogyne, Tomentosae, Rigidiformes, Veitchiae and Verrucosae. This new genus Coelogyne should then contain about 160 species.

The type species is Coelogyne cristata.

Species 

The database IPNI gives 415 entries for this genus, but a large number are invalid or have become synonyms. These are not mentioned in the following traditional list.

 Coelogyne acutilabium de Vogel
 Coelogyne albobrunnea J.J.Sm.
 Coelogyne albolutea Rolfe
 Coelogyne anceps Hook.f.
 Coelogyne asperata Lindl.
 Coelogyne assamica Linden & Rchb.f.
 Coelogyne barbata Lindl. ex Griff.
 Coelogyne beccarii Rchb.f.
 Coelogyne bicamerata J.J.Sm.
 Coelogyne bilamellata Lindl.
 Coelogyne borneensis Rolfe
 Coelogyne brachygyne J.J.Sm.
 Coelogyne brachyptera Rchb.f.
 Coelogyne breviscapa Lindl.
 Coelogyne bruneiensis de Vogel
 Coelogyne buennemeyeri J.J.Sm.
 Coelogyne calcarata J.J.Sm.
 Coelogyne calcicola Kerr
 Coelogyne caloglossa Schltr.
 Coelogyne candoonensis Ames
 Coelogyne carinata Rolfe.
 Coelogyne celebensis J.J.Sm.
 Coelogyne chanii Gravend. & de Vogel
 Coelogyne chlorophaea Schltr.
 Coelogyne chloroptera Rchb.f.
 Coelogyne clemensii Ames & C.Schweinf. in O.Ames.
 Coelogyne clemensii var. angustifolia Carr
 Coelogyne clemensii var. clemensii
 Coelogyne clemensii var. longiscapa Ames & C.Schweinf. in O.Ames
 Coelogyne compressicaulis Ames & C.Schweinf. in O.Ames
 Coelogyne concinna Ridl.
 Coelogyne confusa Ames.
 Coelogyne contractipetala J.J.Sm.
 Coelogyne corymbosa Lindl.
 Coelogyne crassiloba J.J.Sm.
 Coelogyne craticulilabris Carr
 Coelogyne cristata Lindl.
 Coelogyne cumingii Lindl.
 Coelogyne cuprea H.Wendl. & Kraenzl.
 Coelogyne cuprea var. cuprea
 Coelogyne cuprea var. planiscapa J.J.Wood & C.L.Chan
 Coelogyne dichroantha Gagnep
 Coelogyne distans J.J.Sm.
 Coelogyne dulitensis Carr.
 Coelogyne eberhardtii Gagnep
 Coelogyne ecarinata C.Schweinf.
 Coelogyne echinolabium de Vogel
 Coelogyne elmeri Ames.
 Coelogyne endertii J.J.Sm.
 Coelogyne exalata Ridl.
 Coelogyne filipeda Gagnep.
 Coelogyne fimbriata Lindl.
 Coelogyne flaccida Lindl.
 Coelogyne flexuosa Rolfe.
 Coelogyne foerstermannii Rchb.f..
 Coelogyne formosa Schltr.
 Coelogyne fragrans Schltr.
 Coelogyne fuerstenbergiana Schltr.
 Coelogyne fuscescens Lindl.
 Coelogyne fuscescens var. brunnea (Lindl.) Lindl..
 Coelogyne fuscescens var. fuscescens
 Coelogyne fuscescens var. integrilabia Pfitzer in H.G.A.Engler (ed.).
 Coelogyne genuflexa Ames & C.Schweinf. in O.Ames.
 Coelogyne ghatakii T.K.Paul, S.K.Basu & M.C.Biswas
 Coelogyne gibbifera J.J.Sm.
 Coelogyne glandulosa Lindl.
 Coelogyne glandulosa var. bournei S.Das & S.K.Jain
 Coelogyne glandulosa var. glandulosa
 Coelogyne glandulosa var. sathyanarayanae S.Das & S.K.Jain
 Coelogyne gongshanensis H.Li ex S.C.Chen.
 Coelogyne griffithii Hook.f.
 Coelogyne guamensis Ames
 Coelogyne hajrae Phukan.
 Coelogyne harana J.J.Sm.
 Coelogyne hirtella J.J.Sm.
 Coelogyne hitendrae S.Das & S.K.Jain.
 Coelogyne holochila P.F.Hunt & Summerh.
 Coelogyne huettneriana Rchb.f.
 Coelogyne imbricans J.J.Sm.
 Coelogyne incrassata (Blume) Lindl.
 Coelogyne incrassata var. incrassata
 Coelogyne incrassata var. sumatrana J.J.Sm.
 Coelogyne incrassata var. valida J.J.Sm.
 Coelogyne integerrima Ames
 Coelogyne integra Schltr.
 Coelogyne judithiae P.Taylor
 Coelogyne kaliana P.J.Cribb.
 Coelogyne kelamensis J.J.Sm.
 Coelogyne kemiriensis J.J.Sm..
 Coelogyne kinabaluensis Ames & C.Schweinf. in O.Ames.
 Coelogyne lacinulosa J.J.Sm.
 Coelogyne latiloba  Vogel
 Coelogyne lawrenceana Rolfe
 Coelogyne lentiginosa Lindl.
 Coelogyne leucantha W.W.Sm.
 Coelogyne lockii Aver.
 Coelogyne loheri Rolfe
 Coelogyne longiana Aver.
 Coelogyne longibulbosa Ames & C.Schweinf. in O.Ames.
 Coelogyne longifolia (Blume) Lindl.
 Coelogyne longipes Lindl.
 Coelogyne longirachis Ames
 Coelogyne longpasiaensis J.J.Wood & C.L.Chan
 Coelogyne lycastoides F.Muell. & Kraenzl.
 Coelogyne macdonaldii F.Muell. & Kraenzl.
 Coelogyne malintangensis J.J.Sm..
 Coelogyne malipoensis Z.H.Tsi
 Coelogyne marmorata Rchb.f.
 Coelogyne marthae S.E.C.Sierra
 Coelogyne mayeriana Rchb.f.
 Coelogyne merrillii Ames
 Coelogyne micrantha Lindl.
 Coelogyne miniata (Blume) Lindl.
 Coelogyne monilirachis Carr
 Coelogyne monticola J.J.Sm.
 Coelogyne mooreana Rolfe
 Coelogyne mossiae Rolfe
 Coelogyne motleyi Rolfe ex J.J.Wood, D.A.Clayton & C.L.Chan
 Coelogyne moultonii J.J.Sm.
 Coelogyne multiflora Schltr.
 Coelogyne muluensis J.J.Wood
 Coelogyne naja J.J.Sm.
 Coelogyne nervosa A.Rich.
 Coelogyne nitida (Wall. ex D.Don) Lindl.
 Coelogyne obtusifolia Carr
 Coelogyne occultata Hook.f.
 Coelogyne occultata var. occultata
 Coelogyne occultata var. uniflora N.P.Balakr.
 Coelogyne odoardoi Schltr.
 Coelogyne odoratissima Lindl.
 Coelogyne ovalis Lindl.
 Coelogyne palawanensis Ames
 Coelogyne pandurata Lindl. : Black Orchid
 Coelogyne papillosa Ridl. ex Stapf.
 Coelogyne parishii Hook.f.
 Coelogyne peltastes Rchb.f.
 Coelogyne pempahisheyana  H.J.Chowdhery
 Coelogyne pendula Summerh. ex Perry
 Coelogyne pholidotoides J.J.Sm.
 Coelogyne picta Schltr.
 Coelogyne planiscapa Carr.
 Coelogyne planiscapa var. grandis Carr.
 Coelogyne planiscapa var. planiscapa
 Coelogyne plicatissima Ames & C.Schweinf. in O.Ames
 Coelogyne prasina Ridl.
 Coelogyne prolifera Lindl.
 Coelogyne pulchella Rolfe.
 Coelogyne pulverula Teijsm. & Binn.
 Coelogyne punctulata Lindl.
 Coelogyne punctulata f. brevifolia (Lindl.) S.Das & S.K.Jain
 Coelogyne punctulata f. punctulata Coelogyne quadratiloba Gagnep.
 Coelogyne quinquelamellata Ames
 Coelogyne radicosa Ridl.
 Coelogyne radioferens Ames & C.Schweinf. in O.Ames
 Coelogyne raizadae S.K.Jain & S.Das.
 Coelogyne remediosae Ames & Quisumb.
 Coelogyne renae Gravend. & de Vogel.
 Coelogyne rhabdobulbon Schltr.
 Coelogyne rigida C.S.P.Parish & Rchb.f.
 Coelogyne rigidiformis Ames & C.Schweinf.
 Coelogyne rochussenii de Vriese
 Coelogyne rumphii Lindl.
 Coelogyne rupicola Carr.
 Coelogyne salmonicolor Rchb.f.
 Coelogyne sanderae Kraenzl. ex O'Brien
 Coelogyne sanderiana Rchb.f.
 Coelogyne schilleriana Rchb.f. & K.Koch.
 Coelogyne schultesii S.K.Jain & S.Das.
 Coelogyne septemcostata J.J.Sm.
 Coelogyne sparsa Rchb.f.
 Coelogyne speciosa (Blume) Lindl.
 Coelogyne speciosa subsp. fimbriata (J.J.Sm.) Gravend.
 Coelogyne speciosa subsp. incarnata Gravend.
 Coelogyne speciosa subsp. speciosa Coelogyne squamulosa J.J.Sm.
 Coelogyne steenisii J.J.Sm.
 Coelogyne stenobulbum Schltr.
 Coelogyne stenochila Hook.f.
 Coelogyne stricta (D.Don) Schltr.
 Coelogyne suaveolens (Lindl.) Hook.f.
 Coelogyne susanae P.J.Cribb & B.A.Lewis
 Coelogyne swaniana Rolfe
 Coelogyne tenasserimensis Seidenf.
 Coelogyne tenompokensis Carr.
 Coelogyne tenuis Rolfe
 Coelogyne testacea Lindl.
 Coelogyne tiomanensis M.R.Hend.
 Coelogyne tomentosa Lindl. : Necklace Orchid
 Coelogyne tommii Gravend. & P.O'Byrne
 Coelogyne trilobulata J.J.Sm.
 Coelogyne trinervis Lindl.
 Coelogyne triplicatula Rchb.f.
 Coelogyne triuncialis P.O'Byrne & J.J.Verm.
 Coelogyne tumida J.J.Sm.
 Coelogyne undatialata J.J.Sm.
 Coelogyne usitana Roeth & O.Gruss.
 Coelogyne ustulata C.S.P.Parish & Rchb.f.
 Coelogyne vanoverberghii Ames
 Coelogyne veitchii Rolfe
 Coelogyne velutina de Vogel
 Coelogyne venusta Rolfe
 Coelogyne vermicularis J.J.Sm.
 Coelogyne verrucosa S.E.C.Sierra
 Coelogyne virescens Rolfe
 Coelogyne viscosa Rchb.f.
 Coelogyne weixiensis X.H.Jin (2005)
 Coelogyne xyrekes Ridl.
 Coelogyne yiii Schuit. & de Vogel
 Coelogyne zhenkangensis S.C.Chen & K.Y.Lang
 Coelogyne zurowetzii Carr

 Hybrids Coelogyne hybrids include:Coelogyne Memoria W. Micholitz (C. mooreana × C. lawrenceana)Coelogyne Linda Buckley (C. mooreana × C. cristata)Coelogyne Burfordiense (C. pandurata × C. asperata).Coelogyne South Carolina (C. pandurata × C. burfordiense), sometimes called "the black orchid" because of the black coloration of the heavily patterned and structured lip.

 Cultivation 
The wide distribution of this genus has resulted in a wide variety of temperature requirements from species to species, some requiring cool to cold conditions to grow and bloom reliably, while others need decidedly warmer temperatures to achieve the same.

The orchids in this genus require a decided rest period during winter in which they receive no feed, very little water (enough to prevent pseudobulbs shrivelling), cool to cold temperatures and high light. These conditions seem to aid flowering in spring for some growers, though others report that more constant conditions can also produce regular flowering.

 References 

 Further reading 
 Teuscher, H. 1976. Coelogyne and Pleione''. American Orchid Society Bulletin 45(8):688.

 
Arethuseae genera
Epiphytic orchids